The men's middleweight event was part of the boxing programme at the 1992 Summer Olympics. The weight class allowed boxers of up to 75 kilograms to compete. The competition was held from 28 July to 8 August 1992. 28 boxers from 28 nations competed.

Medalists

Results
The following boxers took part in the event:

First round
 Stefan Trendafilov (BUL) – BYE
 Lu Chao (CHN) – BYE
 Chris Johnson (CAN) – BYE
 Mohamed Siluvangi (ZAI) – BYE
 Chris Byrd (USA) def. Mark Edwards (GBR), 21:3
 Aleksandr Lebziak (EUN) def. Justann Crawford (AUS), RSCH-3 (01:56)
 Ahmed Dine (ALG) def. Tommaso Russo (ITA), 6:4
 Raymond Joval (NED) def. Likou Aliu (SAM), RSC-3 (01:30)
 Sven Ottke (GER) def. Richard Santiago (PUR), 15:2
 Brian Lentz (DEN) def. Bandj Altangerel (MGL), 4:0
 Gilberto Brown (ISV) def. Lotfi Missaoui (TUN), 6:4
 Ariel Hernández (CUB) def. Joseph Lareya (GHA), 6:0
 Makoye Isangula (TAN) def. Siamak Varzideh (IRN), RSC-1 (01:58)
 Albert Papilaya (INA) def. Robert Buda (POL), 11:5
 Ricardo Araneda (CHI) def. Luis Hugo Mendez (URU), RSC-2 (02:20)
 Lee Seung-Bae (KOR) def. Michal Franek (TCH), 6:2

Second round
 Stefan Trendafilov (BUL) def. Lu Chao (CHN), RSC-1 (01:45)
 Chris Johnson (CAN) def. Mohamed Siluvangi (ZAI), RSCH-3 (02:39)
 Chris Byrd (USA) def. Aleksandr Lebziak (EUN), 16:7
 Ahmed Dine (ALG) def. Raymond Joval (NED), 22:14
 Sven Ottke (GER) def. Brian Lentz (DEN), 9:2
 Ariel Hernández (CUB) def. Gilberto Brown (ISV), 13:2
 Albert Papilaya (INA) def. Makoye Isangula (TAN), 13:6
 Lee Seung-Bae (KOR) def. Ricardo Araneda (CHI), 12:8

Quarterfinals
 Chris Johnson (CAN) def. Stefan Trendafilov (BUL), RSC-1 (02:52)
 Chris Byrd (USA) def. Ahmed Dine (ALG), 21:2
 Ariel Hernández (CUB) def. Sven Ottke (GER), 14:6
 Lee Seung-Bae (KOR) def. Albert Papilaya (INA), 15:3

Semifinals
 Chris Byrd (USA) def. Chris Johnson (CAN), 17:3
 Ariel Hernández (CUB) def. Lee Seung-Bae (KOR), 14:1

Final
 Ariel Hernández (CUB) def. Chris Byrd (USA), 12:7

References

Middleweight